Sakthi Saravanan is an Indian cinematographer, who works in Tamil and Telugu cinema. He is best known for his hand held and gritty work with Venkat Prabhu and M. Rajesh directorials.
 He has been the cinematographer for many critically acclaimed films such as Chennai 600028, Saroja, Siva Manasula Sakthi, Goa and Boss Engira Bhaskaran. He also cranked the camera for Venkat Prabhu's Mankatha.

Filmography

As cinematographer

As actor
 Thatrom Thookrom (2020)

Awards
International Tamil Film Awards (ITFA)
 Best Cinematographer - Mankatha

References

External links
 
  
 Sakthi Saravanan Imoviehall

Living people
Artists from Madurai
Telugu film cinematographers
Tamil film cinematographers
M.G.R. Government Film and Television Training Institute alumni
Cinematographers from Tamil Nadu
1969 births